Territorial Council elections were held in the French overseas collectivity of Saint Barthélemy on 20 March 2022.

Results

References 

Territorial Council election
Saint Barthélemy
Saint Barthélemy
Saint Barthélemy
Elections in Saint Barthélemy
March 2022 events in France